Qashqeh (also known as Ghashqeh) is a village in Vizhenan Rural District, in the Central District of Gilan-e Gharb County, Kermanshah Province, Iran. At the 2006 census, its population was 188, in 38 families.

References 

Populated places in Gilan-e Gharb County